Tommy Gregory is a Republican member of the Florida Legislature representing the state's 73rd House district, which includes parts of Manatee and Sarasota counties.

Personal Life
Born in Tampa, Gregory is a 20-year veteran of the United States Air Force, where he served as a judge advocate general and prosecutor.

Education
Gregory attended the United States Air Force Academy from 1990 to 1994, graduating with a B.S. in Economics, with military distinction. From 1997 to 2000, Gregory attended the University of Texas School of Law, graduating with a J.D., with honors.

Florida House of Representatives
Gregory defeated Democrat Liv Coleman in the November 6, 2018 general election, winning 61.87% of the vote. He was reelected subsequently in 2020 and 2022.

References

Living people
Florida lawyers
Republican Party members of the Florida House of Representatives
21st-century American politicians
United States Air Force Academy alumni
University of Texas School of Law alumni
1972 births